Yanome Dam is a rockfill dam located in Tochigi prefecture in Japan. The dam is used for irrigation. The catchment area of the dam is 8.6 km2. The dam impounds about 14  ha of land when full and can store 1100 thousand cubic meters of water. The construction of the dam was started on 1976 and completed in 1990.

References

Dams in Tochigi Prefecture
1990 establishments in Japan